Yuli Mikhailovich Vorontsov (also Yuliy Vorontsov) (October 7, 1929, Leningrad  – December 12, 2007, Moscow) was a Soviet and Russian diplomat, President of International Centre of the Roerichs (Moscow). In the mid-1970s he was Chargé d'Affaires at the Soviet embassy in Washington under Ambassador Dobrynin. He was then Ambassador to India (1978-1983) and France (1983-1986). He returned to Moscow to be the first deputy foreign minister (1986-1990) and participated in arms reduction talks with the United States. In 1988-1989, he was simultaneously the Ambassador to Afghanistan as Soviet troops withdrew from the country. He then served as the last Soviet ambassador to United Nations between 1990 and 1991 and as the first Russian Permanent Representative to the UN from 1991 to 1994. After this he served as the Russian ambassador to the United States from 1994 to 1998. In 2000 Vorontsov was chosen as the high-level coordinator for issues related to a paragraph of United Nations Security Council Resolution 1284 which once again required Iraq to face "its obligations regarding the repatriation or return of all Kuwaiti and third country nationals or their remains, [and] the return of all Kuwaiti property [...] seized by Iraq" (during the invasion of Kuwait).

Honours and awards 
 Order "For Merit to the Fatherland", 3rd class
 Order of Honour
 Order of Lenin
 Order of the October Revolution
 Order of the Red Banner of Labour, twice
 Order of the Badge of Honour
 Honored Worker of the Diplomatic Service of the Russian Federation
 Honorary Worker of the Ministry of Foreign Affairs of the Russian Federation
 Medal of Honour "for participation in United Nations" (United Nations Association of Russia)
 "Blessing" (Patriarch of Moscow and all Rus') for his contribution to the revival of the Orthodox Church and the strengthening of Russian-American relations
 Awards of the International Roerich Centre - Commemorative Medals of Nicholas Roerich, Helena Roerich, George de Roerich, Svetoslav Roerich and a silver medal inscribed "J. Vorontsov 75 years ", presented to Vorontsov in his Jubilee in 2004 in recognition of his enormous contribution to the foundation and development of the Museum of Nicholas Roerich and the International Centre
 Padma Bhushan ("Order of the Lotus") (May 2008, posthumously) - for its commitment to strengthening bilateral relations at work not only in India but also in other positions in the Ministry for Foreign Affairs and the Ministry of Foreign Affairs
 Order of the "Pride of Russia" (30 June 2008, posthumously)

References

External links

1929 births
2007 deaths
Politicians from Saint Petersburg
Central Committee of the Communist Party of the Soviet Union members
Communist Party of the Soviet Union members
Moscow State Institute of International Relations alumni
Recipients of the Order "For Merit to the Fatherland", 3rd class
Recipients of the Order of Honour (Russia)
Recipients of the Order of Lenin
Recipients of the Order of the Red Banner of Labour
Recipients of the Padma Bhushan in public affairs
Advisers to the President of Russia
Ambassadors of Russia to the United States
Ambassadors of the Soviet Union to Afghanistan
Ambassadors of the Soviet Union to France
Ambassadors of the Soviet Union to India
Permanent Representatives of Russia to the United Nations
Permanent Representatives of the Soviet Union to the United Nations
Russian diplomats
Soviet diplomats
Burials at Novodevichy Cemetery